Jean-Pierre Morgan (born 30 October 1992) is a Guadeloupean professional footballer who plays as a defender for Championnat National club Stade Briochin. A former representative of France at the 2013 Summer Universiade, he plays for the Guadeloupe national team.

Club career

In 2011, Morgan signed for French fourth division side Agde, where he suffered relegation to the French fifth division. In 2015, Morgan signed for Honvéd in the Hungarian top flight, where he made 5 appearances and scored 1 goal. On 14 March 2015, he debuted for Honvéd during a 1-1 draw with Puskás Akadémia. On 27 May 2015, Morgan scored his first goal for Honvéd during a 1-0 win over Ferencváros.

In 2015, he signed for French fifth division club Fabrègues. Before the second half of 2015-16, Morgan signed for Košice in Slovakia, but left due to them going bankrupt. In 2017, he signed for Baník Ostrava in the Czech top flight, but left due to agent problems. Before the second half of 2017-18, he signed for French fifth division team Canet. In 2018, Morgan signed for Sète in the French fourth division. In 2021, he signed for French third-tier outfit Stade Briochin.

International career 
Morgan represented France at the 2013 Summer Universiade. He debuted for the Guadeloupe national team in a friendly 2–0 loss to Cape Verde on 23 March 2022.

References

External links
 
 

1992 births
Living people
French footballers
Guadeloupean footballers
Guadeloupe international footballers
Association football defenders
Championnat National 2 players
Czech First League players
2. Liga (Slovakia) players
Nemzeti Bajnokság I players
Budapest Honvéd FC players
RCO Agde players
AS Béziers (2007) players
AS Fabrègues players
FC VSS Košice players
FC Baník Ostrava players
Canet Roussillon FC players
FC Sète 34 players
Gazélec Ajaccio players
Stade Briochin players
Championnat National 3 players
Championnat National players
French expatriate sportspeople in the Czech Republic
French expatriate sportspeople in Hungary
French expatriate sportspeople in Slovakia
Expatriate footballers in Slovakia
Expatriate footballers in the Czech Republic
French expatriate footballers
Expatriate footballers in Hungary